The Beattie Peaks Formation is a geologic formation of Early Cretaceous (Valanginian) age in the Western Canada Sedimentary Basin that consists primarily of marine mudstone. It is present in the northern foothills of the Canadian Rockies and the adjacent plains in northeastern British Columbia.

Lithology
The Beattie Peaks Formation consists primarily of dark grey to brownish grey or black mudstones that contain abundant organic matter and are extensively burrowed. Interbeds of argillaceous siltstone and fine-grained sandstone increase toward the top of the formation.

Environment of deposition
The Beattie Peaks Formation was deposited in marine and prodeltaic environments within the Western Interior Seaway.

Paleontology and age
The age of the Beattie Peaks Formation has been determined from its fossil fauna, primarily species of the bivalve Buchia. The formation has also yielded other fossil bivalves, ammonites, and microfossils. Trace fossils made by burrowing organisms are common in its mudstones.

Thickness and distribution
The Beattie Peaks Formation is present in the foothills of the Canadian Rockies and the adjacent plains in northeastern British Columbia, extending from the Prophet River to south of the Pine River.

Relationship to other units
The Beattie Peaks Formation is part of the Minnes Group. It was deposited conformably on the Monteith Formation and is conformably overlain by the Monach Formation, both of which also belong to the Minnes Group. To the south it grades into the lower part of the Gorman Creek Formation.

See also 
 
 List of fossiliferous stratigraphic units in British Columbia

References 

Geologic formations of Canada
Stratigraphy of British Columbia
Cretaceous British Columbia
Valanginian Stage
Mudstone formations
Shallow marine deposits
Western Canadian Sedimentary Basin